The 1923 Sewanee Tigers football team represented the Sewanee Tigers of Sewanee: The University of the South during the 1923 college football season.

Schedule

References

Sewanee
Sewanee Tigers football seasons
Sewanee Tigers football